Harvey R. Snyder (October 17, 1880 – November 26, 1937) was an American football player and coach.

Snyder grew up in Stark County, Ohio, and attended Mount Union College as a preparatory school, before enrolling as a sophomore at Harvard University in 1902.  He played both football and basketball at Harvard.  During the 1904–05 basketball season, he led the team in scoring. He graduated with his bachelor's degree in 1905. Snyder then attended Harvard Law School, graduating in 1908.  On May 20, 1910, Snyder married Mount Union alumna Charlotte Bracher in Alliance, Ohio, and together they had two children, Mary Katherine and Grace Olive.

Coaching

While in law school, Snyder returned to Ohio to coach Oberlin college football in 1906 and remained there for five seasons.  Most notably, Snyder lead Oberlin to two Ohio Athletic Conference championships in 1909 and 1910.  The Oberlin championship teams were led by star players T. Nelson Metcalf and Glen Gray.

In 1911, he moved on to the Western Reserve football team in nearby Cleveland, coaching for three seasons.

Later Years

Snyder left football in 1913 to focus on his law firm in Downtown Cleveland.  Snyder was heavily involved in Freemasonry, where he was a found member of Lakewood, Ohio's Clifton Lodge #664.  Snyder served as the Master in 1927.  Sydney was heavily involved with the Knights of Pythias, achieving the position of Grand Chancellor of Ohio in 1934.

Sydney died on November 26, 1937 in Lakewood, Ohio.

Head coaching record

References

External links
 

1880 births
1937 deaths
Case Western Spartans football coaches
Harvard Crimson football players
Harvard Crimson men's basketball players
Oberlin Yeomen football coaches
Harvard Law School alumni
People from Stark County, Ohio
Coaches of American football from Ohio
Players of American football from Ohio
Basketball players from Ohio
Burials at Lakewood Park Cemetery